Cancela is a surname. Notable people with the surname include:

Arturo Cancela (1882–1957), Argentine novelist and critic
Dani Cancela (born 1981), Spanish Galician footballer
José Cancela (born 1976), Uruguayan soccer player
Yvanna Cancela, American politician

See also
Paleontological Site Arroio Cancela, in the city of Santa Maria, a municipality of Rio Grande do Sul, the southernmost state of Brazil